John Ridgely (born John Huntington Rea, September 6, 1909 – January 18, 1968) was an American film character actor with over 175 film credits.

Early years
Ridgely was born in Chicago, Illinois, the son of John Ridgely Rea. Ridgely's elementary schooling was in Hinsdale, Illinois, and he attended Kemper Military School in Boonville, Missouri. He also attended Stanford University before his debut in movies.

Film
He appeared in the 1946 Humphrey Bogart film The Big Sleep as blackmailing gangster Eddie Mars and had a pivotal role as a suffering heart patient in the film noir Nora Prentiss (1947).  His most prominent other roles were his top-billed part as the bomber captain in Howard Hawks's Air Force and as real-life fighter pilot Tex Hill in 1945's God is My Co-Pilot.

The Chicago-born actor appeared in a large number of other films, particularly for Warner Bros., in the 1930s and 1940s.

Freelancing after 1948, Ridgely continued to essay general-purpose parts until he left films in 1953; thereafter,  he worked in summer-theater productions and television until his death from a heart attack at the age of 58 in 1968.

Selected filmography

 Streamline Express (1935) as 2nd Steward (uncredited)
 They Won't Forget (1937) as Boy in Pool Room (uncredited)
 Submarine D-1 (1937) as Lieutenant Junior Grade (uncredited)
 Missing Witnesses (1937) as Train Ticket Clerk (uncredited)
 Hollywood Hotel (1937) as Tall Hotel Desk Clerk (uncredited)
 The Spy Ring (1938) as Spy Ring Member (uncredited)
 The Patient in Room 18 (1938) as Jim Warren
 The Invisible Menace (1938) as Pvt. Innes (scenes deleted)
 White Banners (1938) as Charles Ellis
 Blondes at Work (1938) as Regan
 Forbidden Valley (1938) as Duke Lafferty
 He Couldn't Say No (1938) as Ed the reporter
 Torchy Blane in Panama (1938) as Reynolds
 Crime School (1938) as Reporter Covering 'Escape' (uncredited)
 Western Trails (1938) as Ben McClure
 Little Miss Thoroughbred (1938) as Jim aka Slug, Becker's Henchman
 Men Are Such Fools (1938) as Jerry (uncredited)
 When Were You Born (1938) as Crenshaw, Policeman (uncredited)
 My Bill (1938) as Mr. Martin, Florist
 Cowboy from Brooklyn (1938) as Beacon Reporter
 Racket Busters (1938) as Yellow Stripe Truck Driver (uncredited)
 Boy Meets Girl (1938) as Simmons – Friday's Film Cutter (uncredited)
 Garden of the Moon (1938) as Sound Control Engineer (uncredited)
 Broadway Musketeers (1938) as Master of Ceremonies (scenes deleted)
 Hard to Get (1938) as Burke
 Torchy Gets Her Man (1938) as Bugs
 Nancy Drew... Detective (1938) as Radio Station Technician (uncredited)
 Going Places (1938) as Desk Clerk
 King of the Underworld (1939) as Jerry
 They Made Me a Criminal (1939) as Magee
 Torchy Blane in Chinatown (1939) as Submarine Officer (uncredited)
 Wings of the Navy (1939) as Dan Morrison
 Nancy Drew... Reporter (1939) as Hotel Clerk (uncredited)
 Secret Service of the Air (1939) as Joe LeRoy
 The Adventures of Jane Arden (1939) as Reporter
 You Can't Get Away with Murder (1939) as Gas Station Attendant
 On Trial (1939) as Radio Announcer (uncredited)
 Women in the Wind (1939) as Salesman (uncredited)
 Dark Victory (1939) as man Making Crack About Judith (uncredited)
 Confessions of a Nazi Spy (1939) as Army Hospital Clerk (uncredited)
 Torchy Runs for Mayor (1939) as Photographer in Mayor's Office (uncredited)
 The Kid from Kokomo (1939) as Sam, a 50% Owner
 Naughty but Nice (1939) as Harry, Hudson's Assistant (uncredited)
 Indianapolis Speedway (1939) as Ted Horn
 Waterfront (1939) as Orchestra Leader (uncredited)
 Each Dawn I Die (1939) as Reporter (uncredited)
 The Cowboy Quarterback (1939) as Mr. Walters
 Torchy Blane... Playing with Dynamite (1939) as Reporter at the Wrestling Match
 Everybody's Hobby (1939) as Ranger Mike Morgan
 The Angels Wash Their Faces (1939) as Reporter at Pillory (uncredited)
 Nancy Drew and the Hidden Staircase (1939) as Reporter
 Smashing the Money Ring (1939) as Policeman (uncredited)
 On Dress Parade (1939) as Fort Lewis Firing Range Sergeant (uncredited)
 The Roaring Twenties (1939) as Cab Driver (uncredited)
 Kid Nightingale (1939) as Whitey
 The Return of Doctor X (1939) as Rodgers
 A Child Is Born (1939) as Intern Going to See Operation (uncredited)
 Private Detective (1939) as Donald Norton
 Invisible Stripes (1939) as Employment Clerk (uncredited)
 The Fighting 69th (1940) as Moran (uncredited)
 Castle on the Hudson (1940) as Intake Guard (uncredited)
 Three Cheers for the Irish (1940) as Photographer (uncredited)
 'Til We Meet Again (1940) as Junior Officer (uncredited)
 Saturday's Children (1940) as Mr. MacReady (voice, uncredited)
 Torrid Zone (1940) as Gardner
 Flight Angels (1940) as Lt. Parsons
 Brother Orchid (1940) as Texas Pearson
 Gambling on the High Seas (1940) as Police Radio Operator (uncredited)
 The Man Who Talked Too Much (1940) as Brooks
 They Drive By Night (1940) as Hank Dawson (uncredited)
 River's End (1940) as Constable Jeffers
 Money and the Woman (1940) as Doctor (uncredited)
 No Time for Comedy (1940) as Cashier (uncredited)
 Knute Rockne All American (1940) as Reporter (scenes deleted)
 The Letter (1940) as Driver (uncredited)
 Father Is a Prince (1940) as Salesman
 Lady with Red Hair (1940) as Actor Playing Paul (uncredited)
 Honeymoon for Three (1941) as Tomahawk Inn Desk Clerk (uncredited)
 The Great Mr. Nobody (1941) as Eddie Williams
 Here Comes Happiness (1941) as Jim
 Knockout (1941) as Pat Martin
 Strange Alibi (1941) as Tex
 The Wagons Roll at Night (1941) as Arch
 Million Dollar Baby (1941) as Ollie Ward
 Highway West (1941) as Alex – Armored Car Guard
 International Squadron (1941) as Bill Torrence
 Navy Blues (1941) as Jersey
 Nine Lives Are Not Enough (1941) as Mechanic (uncredited)
 They Died with Their Boots On (1941) as 2nd Lt. Davis (uncredited)
 Steel Against the Sky (1941) as Joe (uncredited)
 Dangerously They Live (1941) as John
 The Man Who Came to Dinner (1942) as Radio Man
 Bullet Scars (1942) as Hank O'Connor
 The Big Shot (1942) as Tim
 Wings for the Eagle (1942) as Johnson
 Secret Enemies (1942) as Agent John Trent
 Air Force (1943) as Capt. Quincannon, B-17 Pilot 
 Northern Pursuit (1943) as Jim Austin
 Destination Tokyo (1943) as Reserve Officer Raymond
 The Doughgirls (1944) as Julian Cadman
 Arsenic and Old Lace (1944) as Officer Saunders
 Hollywood Canteen (1944) as himself
 God Is My Co-Pilot (1945) as David 'Tex' Hill
 Pride of the Marines (1945) as Jim Merchant
 Danger Signal (1945) as Thomas Turner
 My Reputation (1946) as Cary Abbott
 Two Guys from Milwaukee (1946) as Mike Collins
 The Big Sleep (1946) as Eddie Mars
 The Man I Love (1947) as Roy Otis
 Nora Prentiss (1947) as Walter Bailey, Heart Patient
 That Way with Women (1947) as Sam
 Possessed (1947) as Harker
 That's My Man (1947) as Ramsey
 Cheyenne (1947) as Chalkeye
 Cry Wolf (1947) as Jackson Laidell
 High Wall (1947) as David Wallace
 The Iron Curtain (1948) as RCMP Officer Murphy (uncredited)
 Night Wind (1948) as Walters
 Luxury Liner (1948) as Chief Officer Carver
 Sealed Verdict (1948) as Capt. Lance Nissen
 Trouble Makers (1948) as 'Silky' Thomas
 Command Decision (1948) as James Carwood
 Tucson (1949) as Ben
 Task Force (1949) as Dixie Rankin
 Once More, My Darling (1949) as Burke
 Border Incident (1949) as Mr. Neley
 Backfire (1950) as Plainclothesman (uncredited)
 Beauty on Parade (1950) as Jeffrey Woodstock
 The Lost Volcano (1950) as Fred Barton
 Edge of Doom (1950) as 1st Detective
 The Petty Girl (1950) as Patrolman
 South Sea Sinner (1950) as Don Williams
 Rookie Fireman (1950) as Harry Williams
 Saddle Tramp (1950) as Slim
 Al Jennings of Oklahoma (1951) as Railroad Detective Dan Hanes
 The Last Outpost (1951) as Sam McQuade
 A Place in the Sun (1951) as Coroner
 Thunder in God's Country (1951) as Bill Stafford
 Half Angel (1951) as Tim McCarey
 When the Redskins Rode (1951) as Christopher Gist
 When Worlds Collide (1951) as Chief Customs Inspector (uncredited)
 As You Were (1951) as Captain
 The Blue Veil (1951) as Doctor (uncredited)
 Room for One More (1952) as Harry Foreman
 The Greatest Show on Earth (1952) as Assistant Manager
 Fort Osage (1952) as Henry Travers
 The Outcasts of Poker Flat (1952) as Bill Akeley (uncredited)
 Off Limits (1952) as Lt. Cmdr. Parnell
 The Congregation (1952)

Radio appearances

References

External links

 
 
 

1909 births
1968 deaths
20th-century American male actors
American male film actors
American male television actors
Male actors from Chicago
Male Western (genre) film actors